List of organizations that support the BDS movement include organizations that either has supported the Boycott, Divestment and Sanctions (BDS) movement or has endorsed comprehensive boycotts of Israel. Comprehensive is here defined as a boycott that is not tied to a particular industry (e.g weapons embargo) or exclusive to goods from the Israeli settlements. The list does not include organizations that support BDS' right to call for a boycott of Israel but does not themselves support the boycott. The year column indicates when the organization first professed support for BDS.

See also 
 BDS movement
 List of supporters of the BDS movement
 List of opponents of the BDS movement

Notes

References

Boycott, Divestment and Sanctions
Boycotts of Israel
BDS movement